{{Infobox Boxingmatch
|fight date= April 25, 2015
|Fight Name= The Champion Returns
|image=
|location = Madison Square Garden, New York, United States
|fighter1= Wladimir Klitschko
|nickname1=Dr. Steelhammer
|record1=63–3 (53 KO)
|hometown1=Kyiv, Ukraine
|height1 = 
|weight1 = 
|style1 = Orthodox
|recognition1= WBA (Super), IBF, WBO, IBO, and The Ring heavyweight champion [[The Ring (magazine)|The Ring]] No. 2 ranked pound-for-pound fighter
|fighter2= Bryant Jennings
|nickname2=By-By
|record2=19–0 (10 KO)
|hometown2=Philadelphia, Pennsylvania, U.S.
|height2 = 
|weight2 = 
|style2 = Orthodox
|recognition2=WBANo. 2 Ranked HeavyweightWBONo. 3 Ranked HeavyweightIBFNo. 4 Ranked Heavyweight
|titles=WBA (Super), IBF, WBO, IBO, and The Ring heavyweight titles
|result= Klitschko defeats Jennings by unanimous decision
}}

Wladimir Klitschko vs. Bryant Jennings, billed as The Champion Returns, was a heavyweight fight for the WBA (Super), IBF, WBO, IBO, and The Ring heavyweight titles. The fight took place on April 25, 2015 at Madison Square Garden in New York City.

This was the first time Klitschko had fought in the United States since 2008 and first time the lineal world heavyweight title was fought for in the United States since Lennox Lewis defeated Vitali Klitschko in 2003. His last fight in the United States was a title unification against Sultan Ibragimov. This was also Klitschko's last professional win.

The fight aired on HBO.

 Build-up 
On January 20, 2015 ESPN reported that the potential Klitschko vs. Jennings was confirmed and to take place on April 25, 2015. Negotiations initially started in November 2014. Klitschko's manager, Bernd Boente finally announced the fight and said all contracts had been signed.

Being Jennings first world title fight since turning professional in 2010, he spoke of his excitement, "I have all of the attributes naturally to be a champion that you can't teach – heart and will. I'm psyched up. This is the level where I'm at. This is exactly what I planned to do. Whatever competition you are in, your goal should be to reach the top. This is the top, but now it's about taking it to higher heights and winning." It was reported that Jennings was Deontay Wilder's mandatory challenger for the WBC title, but he gave up the opportunity to fight Klitschko instead.

Klitschko also spoke about the fight, "I do have great respect for Bryant Jennings and his achievements. He has good movement in the ring and good technique. I know this will be a tough challenge. I am extremely happy to fight in New York again. I had my first unification fight here and a lot of great heavyweight matches have taken place at Madison Square Garden. It will definitely be a great fight night and I will do everything for it from my side."''

The Barclays Center in Brooklyn was originally chosen to stage the fight, but no reason was given for the change of venue. It would be the fourth time Wladimir would fight at the Garden.

Fight details 
Klitschko defeated Jennings by effective use of his jab and nullifying Jennings' offensive game on the inside, especially by holding Jennings, which resulted in the referee deducting a point in the 10th round for excessive holding, although Klitschko did end up winning via unanimous decision with scores of (116–111, 116–111, and 118–109) for his 18th successful title defense.

According to Compubox Stats, Klitschko landed 144 of his 545 punches thrown (26%) whilst Jennings landed 110 of 376 (29 percent).

Aftermath
With this win, Klitschko defeated 23rd opponent for the world heavyweight championship, beating a record held by Joe Louis for 67 years. Klitschko also broke Muhammad Ali's record of the most wins in unified championship bouts in boxing history, gaining his 15th win. Klitschko reportedly earned $12.5 million for the fight. Klitschko would later face Tyson Fury and would suffer a shock decision loss. A planned rematch would fall through, and Wladimir would end up facing Anthony Joshua, losing by an 11th-round TKO. Klitschko retired after that fight meaning that the Jennings fight would be the final victory in his long career.

Viewership 
According to Nielsen Media Research, the fight averaged 1.637 million viewers, peaking at 1.742 million viewers. The whole card averaged 1.3 million. The undercard fight between Ali and Santana averaged 1 million viewers.

Fight card

References 

2015 in boxing
World Boxing Association heavyweight championship matches
International Boxing Federation heavyweight championship matches
World Boxing Organization heavyweight championship matches
Boxing on HBO
Boxing matches at Madison Square Garden
2015 in sports in New York City
2010s in Manhattan
Klitschko brothers
April 2015 sports events in the United States